The 2012 Cactus Pheasant Classic was held from October 25 to 28 at the Brooks Curling Club in Brooks, Alberta as part of the 2012–13 World Curling Tour. The event was held in a triple knockout format, and the purse for the event was CAD$70,000. In the final, Kevin Koe defeated Mike McEwen with a score of 6–5.

Teams
The teams are listed as follows:

Knockout results
The draw is listed as follows:

A event

B event

C event

Playoffs
The playoffs draw is listed as follows:

References

External links

Cactus Pheasant Classic
Cactus Pheasant Classic
Cactus Pheasant Classic
Brooks, Alberta